2007 Spa-Francorchamps GP2 Series round was the Tenth And penultimate race of the 2007 GP2 Series season. It was held on 15 September and 16, 2007 at Circuit de Spa-Francorchamps near the village of Francorchamps, Wallonia, Belgium. The race was used as a support race to the 2007 Belgian Grand Prix.

Classification

Qualifying

Feature race

Sprint race

References

Gp2 Round, 2007
Spa-Francorchamps